The following is a list of active schools in the Borough of Burnley in Lancashire, England.

By default, the table below is sorted into state schools (i.e. primary, secondary, special, etc.), independent schools, and further and higher education establishments.

See also
List of schools in Lancashire
Education in England
Office for Standards in Education
List of the oldest schools in the United Kingdom

References

 NGFL Schools in Burnley
 Ofsted (Office for Standards in Education)

Schools in Burnley
Schools In Burnley
Burnley